The 2nd Life Grenadier Regiment, designation I 5, was a Swedish Army infantry regiment that traced its origins back to the 16th century. It was merged into a new regiment in 1927. The regiment's soldiers were recruited from the province of Östergötland.

History 

The regiment has its origins in fänikor (companies) raised in Östergötland in the 16th century. These units later formed Östergötland Infantry Regiment and Östergötland Cavalry Regiment which merged in 1791 and formed Life Grenadier Regiment. This regiment was split in 1816 creating 2nd Life Grenadier Regiment and 1st Life Grenadier Regiment.

The regiment was allotted in 1687. The regiment was given the designation I 5 (5th Infantry Regiment) in a general order in 1816. 2nd Life Grenadier Regiment was then merged with 1st Life Grenadier Regiment in 1928 to reform the old Life Grenadier Regiment.

Campaigns 

None

Organisation 

?

Commanding officers
Executive officers (Sekundchef) and regimental commander active at the regiment in the years 1816–1927. Sekundchef was a title used until 31 December 1974 at regiments that were part of the King's Life and Household Troops (Kungl. Maj:ts Liv- och Hustrupper). In the years 1816–1818, the Crown Prince was the regimental commander. In the years 1818–1927, His Majesty the King was the regimental commander.

Regimental commander

1816–1818: Crown Prince Charles John
1818–1844: Charles XIV John
1844–1859: Oscar I
1859–1872: Charles XV
1872–1905: Oscar II
1907–1927: Gustaf V

Executive officers (Sekundchefer)

1816–1817: C E Skiöldebrand
1817–1825: C Hallencreutz
1825–1844: C D Cronhielm
1844–1853: J F Boy
1853–1862: P C Lovén
1862–1871: E M af Klint
1871–1888: G H Spens
1888–1892: Hemming Gadd
1892–1905: Lars Fredrik Lovén
1905–1916: Magnus Blomstedt
1916–1922: Gustaf Bouveng
1922–1927: Patrik Ludvig Teodor Falkman

Names, designations and locations

See also
List of Swedish infantry regiments

Footnotes

References

Notes

Print

Grenadier regiments of Sweden
Disbanded units and formations of Sweden
Military units and formations established in 1816
Military units and formations disestablished in 1927
1816 establishments in Sweden
1927 disestablishments in Sweden
Linköping Garrison